Prince Island may refer to:

Prince Island (California) 
Prince Island (Western Australia)

See also 
 Prince Islands, a chain of nine islands off the coast of Istanbul, Turkey
 Prince's Island Park, an urban park in the city of Calgary, Alberta, Canada
 Príncipe, island of the country of São Tomé and Príncipe, once known as Prince's Island